Col de la Croix de Fer (el. 2067 m.) is a high mountain pass in the French Alps linking Le Bourg-d'Oisans and Saint-Jean-de-Maurienne.

Details of climb
The approach from the northeast from Saint-Jean-de-Maurienne is 29.5 km at an average gradient of 5.5% with some sections at 9.5%, and the one from the southwest from Rochetaillée 31.5 km at an average gradient of 5.75% with short sections in excess of 11%. When coming from Rochetaillée, the road forks 2.5 km before the summit, leading to the Col du Glandon. There is also an approach from the north from La Chambre via Col du Glandon which is the hardest: 22.7 km at an average gradient of 7.0% (this is the route used for the 2012 Tour de France).

Tour de France
The pass has featured in the Tour de France twenty one times since it was first passed in the 1947 tour when the race was led over the summit by Fermo Camellini.  It was crossed on Stage 11 of the 2012 race, between Albertville and La Toussuire-Les Sybelles. In the 2015 race it was passed twice in the two finale mountain stages stage 19 between Saint-Jean-de-Maurienne to La Toussuire – Les Sybelles, and from the other side in stage 20 between Modane to Alpe d'Huez. The route for stage 20 was changed in June 2015 caused by a landslide in April so Col de la Croix de Fer substitutes both Col du Télégraphe and Col du Galibier.

Appearances in Tour de France

See also
 List of highest paved roads in Europe
 List of mountain passes
 Souvenir Henri Desgrange

References

External links

Map and details of 5 Cycling Routes Up to Col)
Information from Grenoble Cycling Pages (profiles from both directions)
Cycling the Col de la Croix der Fer from Bourg d'Oisans
Profile on climbbybike.com
Croix de Fer cycling. Profiles and pictures 
Le col de la Croix-de-Fer dans le Tour de France 
Tour de France details 
Col de la Croix de Fer on Google Maps (Tour de France classic climbs)
Cycling up to the Col de la Croix de Fer: data, profile, map, photos and description

Landforms of Savoie
Mountain passes of Provence-Alpes-Côte d'Azur
Mountain passes of the Alps
Climbs in cycle racing in France
Transport in Auvergne-Rhône-Alpes